Ałbena Grabowska (born 1971, Pruszków) is a Polish writer and neurologist.

Life and career
She was born in 1971 in Pruszków, Mazovian Voivodeship, Poland. She graduated from the Medical University of Warsaw and specializes in the treatment of epilepsy. On 27 October 2004, she obtained a doctoral degree in medicine. She worked at the Neurology and Epileptology Clinic in Warsaw as well as the Department of Pathophysiology and Electroencephalography of the Dziekanów Leśny Hospital. She also works in the Polish Epileptology Association. For many years, she worked as a columnist and published various medicine-related articles in the press.

She made her literary debut in 2011 when she published her first novel Tam, gdzie urodził się Orfeusz (The Place Where Orpheus Was Born). She writes books belonging both to adult and children's literature. In 2014, she became the ambassador of the "Women's Solidarity" social campaign. In 2015, she received the Pióro Award at the 4th Festival of Women's Literature in Siedlce for her best-selling three-volume historical family saga Stulecie Winnych.

In 2019, Stulecie Winnych was adapted into a TV series by Poland's national public broadcaster TVP 1 channel. It was directed by Piotr Trzaskalski and stars Kinga Preis, Olaf Lubaszenko, Adam Ferency, and Jan Wieczorkowski.

Personal life
She is of Polish–Bulgarian descent and apart from Polish speaks fluent Bulgarian. She has three children: Julian, Alina and Franciszek.

Works

See also
Polish literature
List of Poles

References

1971 births
Living people
Polish writers
Polish women novelists
Polish people of Bulgarian descent
People from Pruszków
21st-century Polish novelists
21st-century Polish women writers
Polish neurologists
Medical University of Warsaw alumni